Raymond Alan Parry (19 January 1936 – 23 May 2003) was an English footballer.

Parry was born in Derby, Derbyshire and joined Bolton Wanderers in 1951 and made his senior debut against Wolves at Burnden Park after playing six games in the reserves, becoming the youngest player ever to play in the First Division, at the age of 15 years and 267 days. The inside forward was a member of the 1958 FA Cup-winning team and also won two full England caps. He left Bolton in 1960 for Blackpool, and four years later moved to Bury.

His four brothers were also footballers - Jack played for Derby County, Cyril for Notts County, and Reg and Glynn who both played in non-league.

References

External links
 Obituary

1936 births
2003 deaths
English footballers
England international footballers
England under-23 international footballers
Bolton Wanderers F.C. players
Blackpool F.C. players
Bury F.C. players
Footballers from Derby
English Football League players
English Football League representative players
Association football inside forwards
FA Cup Final players